ARA General Belgrano was a  armoured cruiser of the Argentine Navy. The ship was built in Italy, along with three sister ships also for Argentina (Garibaldi, Pueyrredón and San Martín). The vessel was the first to have been named after the Argentine founding father Manuel Belgrano (1770–1820). The ship was laid down in 1896 and served on the Argentine Navy until she was stricken on 8 May 1947.

Service history 
The cruiser was built at the Cantiere Navale Fratelli Orlando, in Livorno, where her hull was laid down in 1896 and launched on 25 July 1897. She was purchased in 1898 by the government of Argentina, engaged in a diplomatic conflict with Chile. After testing of machinery and artillery, General Belgrano entered service on 8 October 1898, departing the same day entered the port of Genoa, under the command of Captain Emilio Barilari, arriving at their destination in Mar del Plata, on November 6 of that year.

After the conflict with Chile, 20 January 1899, she carried the President of Argentina Julio Argentino Roca and the President of Chile Federico Errazuriz Echaurren for signing the peace treaty. After visiting Santa Cruz, Rio Gallegos, Puerto Harberton and Ushuaia, arrived on February 15, 1899, in Punta Arenas where the two presidents signed the peace treaty between the two countries.

In 1902 she was put on hold and after being fitted with a telegraph set in 1907, she was drafted into the fleet again in 1908. In 1912 she was equipped with a radio transmitter. In 1927 he began work to modernize the naval base of Puerto Belgrano, but before the end of this modernization, left for Europe, visiting Genoa, from 7 to 16 October, where the crew attended the unveiling of a monument to General Belgrano. Later, she visited Spain and again returned to Genoa to continue the modernization work, including the conversion of boilers to consume gasoline, installing a new mast and changes in the artillery.

At the end of this modernization, 25 October 1929, arriving part to Buenos Aires on 24 November next. In 1933 she ranked as a coast guard ship and in December the same year is sent to Mar de Plata to be used as a depot ship for submarines. On 8 May 1947, after nearly 50 years of service, General Belgrano was discharged. Towed to Buenos Aires, she was broken up in the Matanza River shipyards.

References

Further reading 
 Burzaco, Ricardo. Acorazados y Cruceros De La Armada Argentina. Eugenio B., Buenos Aires, 1997.  
 Arguindeguy, Pablo E. Apuntes sobre los buques de la Armada Argentina (1810–1970). Comando en Jefe de la Armada, Buenos Aires, 1972.

External links 
 

Garibaldi-class cruisers of the Argentine Navy
Ships built in Livorno
1896 ships